The 1894–95 season was the seventh season of The Football League.

During the first five seasons of the league the re-election process had concerned the clubs which finished in the bottom four of the league, but as of the 1894–95 season the re-election requirement was reduced to the last three clubs in Division Two.

However, as Lincoln City (fourth from last) and Walsall Town Swifts (third from last) both finished with 20 points, they were both subjected to the re-election process, and Walsall eventually resigned from the league. After this, and until the 1976–77 season, goal average (explained below) was used to determine a club's exact position and there were no more anomalies in the re-election processes.

Goal average was calculated by dividing the goals scored with goals conceded, and would more appropriately be called goal ratio. In case one or more teams had the same goal difference, this system favoured those teams who had scored fewer goals. The goal average system was eventually scrapped beginning with the 1976–77 season.

League standings
The tables below are reproduced here in the exact form that they can be found at The Rec.Sport.Soccer Statistics Foundation website and in Rothmans Book of Football League Records 1888–89 to 1978–79, with home and away statistics separated.

Match results are drawn from The Rec.Sport.Soccer Statistics Foundation website and Rothmans for the First Division and from Rothmans for the Second Division.

First Division

Results

Maps

Second Division

Results

Maps

Test matches
The Football League test matches were a set of play-offs, in which the bottom First Division teams faced the top Second Division teams. The First Division teams, if coming out as winners, would retain their places in the division. If a Second Division team won, it would be considered for First Division membership through an election process. Losing Second Division teams would stay in the Second Division.

As a result of these matches, Bury, Derby County and Stoke were placed in the First Division the following season, while Liverpool, Notts County and Newton Heath went into the Second Division.

See also
1894-95 in English football
1894 in association football
1895 in association football

References

External links

Ian Laschke: Rothmans Book of Football League Records 1888–89 to 1978–79. Macdonald and Jane's, London & Sydney, 1980.

1894-95
1